The Canton of Bastia-2 is one of the 15 cantons of the Haute-Corse department, France. Since the French canton reorganisation which came into effect in March 2015, the communes of the canton of Bastia-2 are:
Bastia (partly)

References

Bastia-2
Canton 2